Newhaven is a hamlet in the county of Derbyshire, England, east of Hartington and west of Cromford.

The principal employer in the area is DSF Refractories & Minerals Ltd. The hamlet is located within the Peak District National Park.

See also
Listed buildings in Hartington Nether Quarter

Hamlets in Derbyshire
Towns and villages of the Peak District
Derbyshire Dales